Joel N. Myers is an American businessman who is the founder, CEO, and chairman of AccuWeather, an American commercial weather service and media company.

Background
Myers is a native of Philadelphia, Pennsylvania.  He founded AccuWeather in State College, Pennsylvania, in 1962. Myers served on the faculty of Penn State from 1964 until 1981 as instructor, lecturer, and assistant professor; he estimates that by the time he retired from teaching he had taught weather forecasting to approximately 17% of all practicing meteorologists in the United States. Additionally, he served on the Pennsylvania State University board of trustees for 33 years, and continues to serve as an Emeritus Trustee.

Dr. Myers received the American Meteorological Society’s 2018 Award for Outstanding Contributions to the Advancement of Applied Meteorology, and the National Weather Association’s 2017 Lifetime Achievement Award, in addition to numerous other accolades. He is a trustee of the board of directors for the Committee for Economic Development (CED), where he also serves on the education subcommittee, and he is a Fellow of the Nantucket Project.

In 2007, Myers appointed his younger brother Barry Lee Myers, a business attorney, as AccuWeather's chief executive officer. The younger Myers was nominated by President Donald Trump to head the National Oceanic and Atmospheric Administration in October 2017.  Dr. Myers resumed his position as CEO in 2019 following his brother's departure from the company.

Political activities
Myers faced criticism in 2005 when he supported the National Weather Service Duties Act of 2005, a bill introduced by U.S. Senator Rick Santorum (R-PA) that would have prohibited the National Weather Service from publishing weather data to the public when private-sector entities, such as AccuWeather, perform the same function commercially.  Myers has been a long-time large donor to the Republican Party, its candidates, and to Santorum, a former home-state Senator.

Controversies
The Office of Federal Contract Compliance Programs compiled a report by federal investigators that started after a complaint filed Sept. 6, 2016, alleging a “hostile work environment and termination based on sexual orientation and sex.”  The investigators found rampant workplace sexual harassment and female employees receiving favors while having sexual relations with their supervisors, including an unnamed executive. The report found Accuweather “did not take reasonable action to prevent and remedy harassing conduct.” Joel Myers, who was president of Accuweather during the period covered by the agreement, signed a settlement where AccuWeather agrees to pay out $290,000 to at least 39 women, institute in-person training for managers to identify harassment, and send harassment complaints to a 3rd party till at least 2018

References

External links 
 

American meteorologists
Central High School (Philadelphia) alumni
Penn State College of Earth and Mineral Sciences alumni
People from State College, Pennsylvania
Living people
1939 births